State of Control is a 1989 heavy metal album released by the Christian metal band Barren Cross. The album was produced by John Elefante of Kansas fame and his brother Dino.

Track listing 
 "State of Control" - 3:52
 "Out of Time" - 4:09 
 "Cryin' Over You" - 4:53 
 "A Face in the Dark" - 3:55
 "The Stage of Intensity" - 6:36 
 "Hard Lies" - 4:18
 "Inner War" - 4:09
 "Love at Full Volume" - 2:28
 "Bigotry Man (Who Are You)" - 4:42 
 "Two Thousand Years" - 7:09
 "Your Love Gives" - 3:54
 "Escape in the Night" - 3:54

Credits

Band
Mike Lee - lead vocals and acoustic guitar
Ray Parris - rhythm and lead guitar, acoustic guitars, background vocals
Steve Whitaker - drums, background vocals
Jim LaVerde - bass  guitar, taurus synthesizer pedals, background vocals

Additional musicians
Dino Elefante - additional vocals 
John Elefante - keyboards, additional vocals

References

1989 albums
Barren Cross albums
Enigma Records albums